Jessica "Jess" Ruffner (also known as Jessica Ruffner-Booth) is a colorist who has worked in the comics industry.

She has also written parts of the Anita Blake: Vampire Hunter comic book adaptations, collaborating with artist Ron Lim.

Sources

External links
 

Living people
American comics writers
Comics colorists
Year of birth missing (living people)
American female comics artists
Female comics writers
Place of birth missing (living people)